Aegialoalaimidae is a family of nematodes belonging to the order Leptolaimida.

Genera:
 Aegialoalaimus de Man, 1907

References

Chromadorea
Nematode families